Kottarakkulam Sree Mahaganapathy Kovil, Kollam is a popular temple in Kollam, Kerala, South India.

The temple is situated in the centre part of the Kollam corporation, near the Kollam Civil Station. The main deity enshrined here is Lord Ganesh, apart from Nagaraja and Swami Aiyappan. The main priest-hold of this temple is run by Tamil Brahmin community of Kollam Corporation, consisting of 270 families. The Prasadams here are mainly Appams and Modakams. The annual Vinayaka Chathurthi festival of the Kottarakulam Maha ganapathy here begins in August. Rituals including Ashta Dravya Mahaganapathy Homam, Kalashapooja, laksharchana and pushpabhishekam forms a major attraction here.

History
The temple over the years has attracted a number of devotees from far-off places, especially in recent years. The temple, although a modern one in appearance, is actually an ancient temple, which was reconstructed and developed much to its present form in the year 1984.

The March issue of the Malayalam monthly magazine Jyotisharatnam carried an article on this temple. One of the former priests, Late Shri. Ramayya Vadhyar, who served as the chief priest of for a very long time, found special mention in that issue. Some of the other notable priests who have served the shrine includes late Shri Sankara Narayana Vadhyar, Brahmashri Narayana Sastrigal (a.k.a. Rajamani Vadhyar), Shri, Kannan Vadhyar etc.

The priests who serve at present are Shri Sankara Vadhyar and Shri. Venkatarama Vadhyar and Chandru
 Vadhyar.  The Almighty Lord supports a lot of people and families who are related with the temple. Shri. Venkatarama Vadhyar now serves as the chief priest. Sri Sankara Subramonian is the secretary.

Daily Pooja Timings

See also
 Temples of Kerala

References

Hindu temples in Kollam district